Lawnstarter is an American online platform for mowing. It is based in Austin, Texas.

History
Lawnstarter was founded in 2013 by Jonas Weigert, Ryan Farley, Steve Corcoran in Washington, D.C. and later moved to Austin, Texas. A year later, they joined Techstars Austin accelerator program.

In January 2015, Lawnstarter raised $1 million in seed funding. Later, in the same year, they received an additional investment of $6 as part of Series A funding. By June 2015, they were active in twelve cities of the U.S.

Lawnstarter is also active in research studies, and in 2017, they found in a research study that Austin had enough population to become a new state.

In November 2019, it received an additional investment of $10.5 million.

In 2020, Lawnstarter was included in Austin American-Statesman's Greater Austin Top Employers list.

In August 2021, Lawnstarter acquired Lawn Love for an undisclosed amount.

Platform
It is an online platform that allows to reserve lawn care and mowing services through a website or a mobile application. It also tracks weather and accordingly revises the schedule as needed.

LawnStarter has been called an Uber for lawn services.

References

2013 establishments in the United States